Çerçili is a village in the İslahiye District, Gaziantep Province, Turkey. The village had a population of 295 in 2022. The village is inhabited by Tahtacı, a subgroup of Alevi Turkomans, who belong to the Hacı Emirli ocak. The türbe of the founder of this ocak, İbrahim Sani, is located in Çerçili.

The village was known as Tut Alanı ( 'mulberry field') in the 16th century and was inhabited by dervishes of İbrahim Baba and Ayrums.

References

Villages in İslahiye District